One of a Kind is an album by American pianist Dave Grusin released in 1977, recorded for the Polydor label. It was reissued in 1984 by GRP Records.

Track listing
"Montage"	9:20	
"Playera"	8:44	
"Modaji"	7:42	
"The Heart is a Lonely Hunter"	6:13	
"Catavento"	4:04

Personnel
Dave Grusin - Fender Rhodes Electric Piano, Acoustic Piano, Synthesizer, Percussion, Conductor
Lee Ritenour - guitar
Francisco Centeno, Anthony Jackson - Bass
Ron Carter - Double Bass
Steve Gadd - Drums
Ralph MacDonald - Percussion
Grover Washington Jr. - Soprano Saxophone
Dave Valentin - Flute
Larry Rosen - Triangle
Don Elliot - Mellophone 
David Davis, Lewis Eley, Marvin Morgenstern, Max Hollander, Noel Pointer, Paul Winter, Peter Dimitriades, Ralph Oxman, Raymond Kunicki, Regis Iandiorio, Richard Maximoff, Seymour Barab, Theodore Israel - Strings
Ted Jensen - mastering engineer

Charts

References

External links
 Dave Grusin-One Of A Kind at Discogs

1977 albums
Polydor Records albums
GRP Records albums
Dave Grusin albums